Artur Jorge Rocha Vicente (born 26 December 1972) is a retired Cape Verdean football striker.

References

1972 births
Living people
Footballers from Lisbon
Citizens of Cape Verde through descent
Cape Verdean footballers
Cape Verde international footballers
Portuguese footballers
Portuguese people of Cape Verdean descent
C.D. Beja players
G.D. Estoril Praia players
S.C. Espinho players
S.C. Salgueiros players
Boavista F.C. players
U.D. Leiria players
Rio Ave F.C. players
Vitória F.C. players
Portimonense S.C. players
C.D. Santa Clara players
Juventude Sport Clube players
Atlético Clube de Portugal players
Association football forwards
Primeira Liga players
Cape Verdean expatriate footballers
Portuguese expatriate footballers
Expatriate footballers in Angola
Cape Verdean expatriate sportspeople in Angola
Portuguese expatriate sportspeople in Angola